The 2nd Natal Grand Prix was a motor race, run to South African Formula One-style rules, held on 22 December 1962 at Westmead Circuit, South Africa. The field was split into two heats, with a subsequent final. The heats consisted of 22 laps, and the final was run over 33 laps, and was won by British driver Trevor Taylor in his Lotus 25.

The event was marred by the death of Rhodesian driver Gary Hocking, who was killed in practice driving the Rob Walker Racing Team Lotus 24.

Jim Clark posted the fastest time in practice, and was on pole position for the first heat. However, after exchanging the lead several times with Richie Ginther, he experienced problems during the heat and was classified 12th. Ginther won the heat with local driver Bruce Johnstone finishing second. Graham Hill was on pole for the second heat, which was won by Taylor with Hill second, after a battle throughout the race.

Clark started at the back of the grid for the final, with Ginther, Taylor and Hill forming the front row. Hill's car suffered ignition failure, but Clark raced through the field to beat Ginther and take second behind Taylor, who led throughout.

Qualifying

Non-starters

Car #23 was withdrawn by Serrurier, who drove #11 in the race. The withdrawn car was ultimately driven by Trundell and wore #35.

Results

Heat one

Heat two

Final

References

 "The Grand Prix Who's Who", Steve Small, 1995.
 "The Formula One Record Book", John Thompson, 1974.
 Race results at www.silhouet.com 

Natal Grand Prix
Natal Grand Prix
Natal Grand Prix
Natal Grand Prix